Castelo Branco District is located in Central Portugal. Its capital is Castelo Branco, which is now also its most populous city, overtaking Covilhã, which was once the largest city, in the late 2010s.

Municipalities
The district is composed of 11 municipalities:

 Belmonte
 Castelo Branco
 Covilhã
 Fundão
 Idanha-a-Nova
 Oleiros
 Penamacor
 Proença-a-Nova
 Sertã
 Vila de Rei
 Vila Velha de Ródão
All 11 municipalities is divided into 120 freguesias or parishes.

Summary of votes and seats won in national elections since 1976

|- class="unsortable"
!rowspan=2|Parties!!%!!S!!%!!S!!%!!S!!%!!S!!%!!S!!%!!S!!%!!S!!%!!S!!%!!S!!%!!S!!%!!S!!%!!S!!%!!S!!%!!S!!%!!S!!%!!S
|- class="unsortable" align="center"
!colspan=2 | 1976
!colspan=2 | 1979
!colspan=2 | 1980
!colspan=2 | 1983
!colspan=2 | 1985
!colspan=2 | 1987
!colspan=2 | 1991
!colspan=2 | 1995
!colspan=2 | 1999
!colspan=2 | 2002
!colspan=2 | 2005
!colspan=2 | 2009
!colspan=2 | 2011
!colspan=2 | 2015
!colspan=2 | 2019
!colspan=2 | 2022
|-
| align="left"| PS || style="background:#FF66FF;"|36.4 || style="background:#FF66FF;"|3 || 27.8 || 2 || 30.3 || 2 || style="background:#FF66FF;"|37.1 || style="background:#FF66FF;"|3 || 18.5 || 1 || 22.4 || 2 || 32.4 || 2 || style="background:#FF66FF;"|53.2 || style="background:#FF66FF;"|3  || style="background:#FF66FF;"|51.6 || style="background:#FF66FF;"|3 || style="background:#FF66FF;"|46.1 || style="background:#FF66FF;"|3 || style="background:#FF66FF;"|56.0 || style="background:#FF66FF;"|4 || style="background:#FF66FF;"|41.0 || style="background:#FF66FF;"|2 || 34.8 || 2 || style="background:#FF66FF;"|38.9 || style="background:#FF66FF;"|2 || style="background:#FF66FF;"|40.9 || style="background:#FF66FF;"|3 || style="background:#FF66FF;"|47.7 || style="background:#FF66FF;"|3
|-
| align="left"| PSD || 22.6 || 2 || align=center colspan=4 rowspan=2|In AD || 30.6 || 2 || style="background:#FF9900;"|31.2 || style="background:#FF9900;"|3 || style="background:#FF9900;"|52.1 || style="background:#FF9900;"|4 || style="background:#FF9900;"|51.8 || style="background:#FF9900;"|3 || 32.1 || 2 || 32.0|| 2 || 38.3 || 2 || 26.7 || 1 || 29.8 || 2 || style="background:#FF9900;"|37.9 || style="background:#FF9900;"|2 || align=center colspan=2 rowspan=2|In PàF || 26.3 || 1 || 27.4 || 1
|-
| align="left"| CDS-PP || 19.9 || 2 || 13.2 || 1 || 9.6 ||  || 4.7 ||  || 3.9 ||  || 7.2 ||  || 6.3 ||  || 7.1 ||  || 5.3 ||  || 8.4 ||  || 9.6 ||  || 3.7 ||  || 1.6
|-
| align="left"| AD || colspan=2| || style="background:#00FFFF;"|49.9 || style="background:#00FFFF;"|4 || style="background:#00FFFF;"|51.0 || style="background:#00FFFF;"|4 || colspan=26|
|-
| align="left"| PRD || colspan=8| || 24.4 || 2 || 6.0 ||  || colspan=20|
|-
| align="left"| PàF || colspan=26| || 35.3 || 2 || colspan=4| 
|-
! Total seats || colspan=2|7 || colspan=10|6 || colspan=10|5 || colspan=10|4
|-
! colspan=33|Source: Comissão Nacional de Eleições
|}

 
Districts of Portugal